Roderick Lampe (born July 10, 1985) is a former Aruban football player. He played for Aruba national team in a single match in 2004.

National team statistics

External links

1985 births
Living people
Aruban footballers
Association football forwards
SV Deportivo Nacional players
Aruba international footballers